Bob Scrabis (born c. 1967) is a former college basketball player for Princeton Tigers men's basketball. He is known for being the 1989 Ivy League Men's Basketball Player of the Year and for his participation in the 1989 Georgetown vs. Princeton men's basketball game. He is the son of professional gridiron football player Bob Scrabis.

Early life
He is the son of Bob and Janis Scrabis and has two sisters: Amy and Kristin; His father played football at Penn State before playing in the American Football League for the New York Titans. Raised in Avon-by-the-Sea, New Jersey, Scrabis attended Red Bank Catholic High School where he played point guard and graduated as the school's all-time leading scorer. In high school, he was included in the Sports Illustrated "Faces in the Crowd" section of the March 12, 1984 edition of the magazine for a 23–24 free throw shooting performance in a victory over Long Branch High School. As a senior, he averaged 20.2 points, 10.2 rebounds and 3.5 assists.

College
Scrabis had several memorable performances in the Penn–Princeton men's basketball rivalry. As a sophomore, he hit a jumper with three seconds left to force overtime against Penn on February 3, 1987, but Princeton lost by a point. In the rematch, three weeks later, he established a career high with 24 points to lead Princeton to a 63–59 victory.

On December 30, 1988, Scrabis helped defeat 16th-ranked South Carolina with a 26-point performance.

The March 17, 1989 Georgetown vs. Princeton men's basketball game was a first-round game in the 1989 NCAA Division I men's basketball tournament that pitted the #1 seed Georgetown Hoyas against the #16 seed Princeton Tigers. The closeness of the game is said to have been the reason that lesser automatic bid teams were not cut from the NCAA Division I men's basketball tournament. Scrabis took the first of two shots in the closing seconds of the game that were blocked by Alonzo Mourning to preserve a 50–49 margin of victory for Georgetown. He rebounded a missed free throw with 23 seconds remaining. Then, his three point shot was blocked with 8 seconds left. With 15 points, he was Princeton's high scorer in the game. Because of his role in preserving the invitations for lesser automatic bids Bleacher Report describes Scrabis as "the face of Cinderella".

Scrabis was an All-Ivy first team selection in 1988 and 1989 and earned Ivy League Men's Basketball Player of the Year in 1989. He ended his career as Princeton's 4th leading scorer (behind Bill Bradley, Pete Campbell and Craig Robinson). He played forward for Princeton.

Career
In October 1989, following his basketball career he was invited to the training camp at Princeton's Jadwin Gym for the New Jersey Nets of the National Basketball Association by Willis Reed, but he was released after 9 days. He retired from basketball and eventually went into finance.

Notes

External links
stats at Sports Reference

Living people
American men's basketball players
Basketball players from New Jersey
Guards (basketball)
People from Avon-by-the-Sea, New Jersey
Princeton Tigers men's basketball players
Red Bank Catholic High School alumni
Sportspeople from Monmouth County, New Jersey